Uncle (1964) is a children's novel written by J. P. Martin, the first book of six forming the Uncle series. It is named after the main character, a rich philanthropic elephant who lives in a huge fantastical castle populated by many other eccentric animals and people. It was illustrated, like the others in the series, by Quentin Blake.

Plot summary

The book introduces the main characters in the series; Uncle, his helpers, including the Old Monkey, Cloutman, Gubbins and the One-Armed Badger, and his enemies, the Badfort crowd, including Beaver Hateman, Sigismund Hateman, Nailrod Hateman, Filljug Hateman, Jellytussle, Hootman and Hitmouse. After a series of incidents, the Badfort crowd construct a cinema with a hidden iron cage in which they trap Uncle, who is then rescued by a surprise attack by his allies.

Reprint
The book was reprinted in paperback in 2000 by Red Fox. It was reprinted in a facsimile hardback edition by the New York Review of Books in 2007 and again in 2009.

External links
 New York Review of Books reprint and Uncle page

References

1964 British novels
1964 children's books
British children's novels
Children's fantasy novels
Books about elephants
Jonathan Cape books